Sir Arthur Keith FRS FRAI (5 February 1866 – 7 January 1955) was a British anatomist and anthropologist, and a proponent of scientific racism. He was a fellow and later the Hunterian Professor and conservator of the Hunterian Museum of the Royal College of Surgeons of England. He was a strong proponent of Piltdown Man, but finally conceded it to be a forgery shortly before his death.

Career
A leading figure in the study of human fossils, he became President of the Royal Anthropological Institute. The latter role stimulated his interest in the subject of human evolution, leading to the publication of his book A New Theory of Human Evolution, in which he supported the idea of group selection.

Where others had postulated that physical separation could provide a barrier to interbreeding, allowing groups to evolve along different lines, Keith introduced the idea of cultural differences as providing a mental barrier, emphasising territorial behaviour, and the concept of the 'in-group' and 'out-group'. Man had evolved, he claimed, through his tendency to live in small competing communities, a tendency which was at root determined by racial differences in his 'genetic substrate'. Writing just after World War II he particularly emphasised the racial origins of anti-Semitism, and in A New Theory of Evolution he devoted a chapter to the topics of anti-Semitism and Zionism in which he argued that Jews have survived by developing a particularly strong sense of community between Jews worldwide based around cultural practices rather than homeland, while applying the 'dual code' in such a way that perceived persecution strengthened their sense of superiority and cohesion.

He is also famous for discovering the sinoatrial node, the component of the heart which makes it beat, with his student Martin Flack in 1906.

Life

He was born at Quarry Farm near Old Machar in Aberdeenshire
, the son of John Keith, a farmer, and his wife, Jessie Macpherson. He was educated at Gordon's College in Aberdeen.

He obtained a Bachelor of Medicine at the University of Aberdeen in 1888. He travelled to Siam on a gold mining trip in 1889 where he gathered plants for Royal Botanic Gardens, Kew in London in his capacity as a plant collector assistant for the Botanical Survey of the Malay Peninsula.

On returning to Britain in 1892, Keith studied anatomy at University College London and at the University of Aberdeen. It was at Aberdeen where Keith won the first Struthers Prize in 1893 for his demonstration of ligaments in humans and other apes. In 1894, he was made a fellow of the Royal College of Surgeons of England. In 1908, as he says in 'A New Theory of Evolution', he was 'put in charge of the vast treasury of things housed in the Museum of the Royal College of Surgeons', which brought about a shift in his interest from anatomy to the pursuit of 'the machinery of human evolution'.

He studied primate skulls, and in 1897 he published An Introduction to the Study of Anthropoid Apes. Other works include Human Embryology and Morphology (1902), Ancient Types of Man (1911), The Antiquity of Man (1915), Concerning Man's Origins (1927), and A New Theory of Human Evolution (1948).

Keith was editor of the Journal of Anatomy between 1915 and 1936 and elected President of the Anatomical Society of Great Britain and Ireland for 1918 to 1920. He gave the 1927 presidential address (Darwin's Theory of Man's Descent As It Stands To-day) to the British Association meeting in Leeds.  The same year the University of Leeds awarded him an honorary doctorate.

He was elected a Fellow of the Royal Society in 1913. He was knighted in 1921, and he published New Discoveries in 1931. In 1932, he helped found a research institute in Downe, Kent, where he worked until his death.

In 1899 he married Cecilia Caroline Gray (d.1934). They had no children.

He died at his home in Downe, Kent on 7 January 1955.

European hypothesis

British anthropologists Keith and Grafton Elliot Smith were both fixed on European origin of humankind and were in opposition to models of Asian and African origin.

In 1925 Raymond Dart announced the discovery of Australopithecus africanus, which he claimed was evidence for an early human ancestor in Africa. The British anthropologists of the time, who firmly believed in the European hypothesis, did not accept finds outside of their own soil. Keith, for example, described “Darts child” as a juvenile ape and nothing to do with human ancestry.

Racial views

In conjunction with his Eurocentric view on human evolution in Europe as being separate from Africa, Keith shared scientific racist views with a number of other intellectuals and writers during the 1920s, often based on Galtonism and the belief that opposition to cross-breeding in animals could be applied to miscegenation. In 1931, with John Walter Gregory, he delivered the annual Conway Hall lecture entitled Race as a Political Factor. The lecture contained as its abstract: The three primary racial groups within the human species are the Caucasian, mongoloid and negroid. From analogy with cross-breeding in animals and plants, and from experience of human cross-breeding, it can be asserted that inter-marriage between members of the three groups produces inferior progeny. Hence racial segregation is to be recommended. However, the different races can still assist, and co-operate with, each other, in the interests of peace and harmony.

Piltdown Man hoax
Keith was a strong proponent of the Piltdown Man.  Piltdown: A Scientific Forgery, written by the anthropologist Frank Spencer after completing the research of Ian Langham (an Australian historian of science who suspected Keith, and died in 1984), explored the link between Keith and Charles Dawson and suggested it was Keith who prepared the fake specimens for Dawson to plant. Phillip Tobias details the history of the investigation of the hoax, dismissing other theories, and listing inconsistencies in Keith's statements and actions. More recent evidence points to Martin Hinton, but the case remains open.

Writings

A Manual of Practical Anatomy (1901)
with Alfred William Hughes

Human Embryology and Morphology (1902, 6th ed. 1949)

The Antiquity of Man (1915, 2d ed. 1925)

Concerning Man's Origins (1927) 
Concerning Man's Origins, a book based on his Presidential Address at the British Association in 1927, contains a chapter entitled 'Capital as a Factor in Evolution' in which he proposes an interesting explanation for Britain's leading role in the development of industrial society. Essentially he argues that the cold unwelcoming climate of Britain selected those who came here for a special ability to store food and supplies for the winter – those who didn't died out.  This 'capitalism' provided a secure way of life with time to think and experiment, for a population that had been selected for inventiveness and resourcefulness. Out of this special population sprang the Industrial Revolution, centred on the colder Northern counties of England like Lancashire and Yorkshire where the high-tech developments of the time took place in spinning and weaving. This is a rare book today, which does not appear to be available as a reprint.

The Place of Prejudice in Modern Civilisation (1931)
An address given to Students at Aberdeen University. Keith’s concluding sentences in this book sums up his thesis : "Even in the modern world we must listen to the voice of Nature. Under the control of reason, prejudice has to be given a place in the regulation of human affairs". (p. 54) Keith remarks that the 18th century common sense realist philosopher Thomas Reid reached the same conclusion.  Keith also cites Adam Smith, the theoretical father of capitalism, who in his 'The Theory of Moral Sentiments' (1759) regarded prejudices as part of human nature, to both preserve human life and for the welfare of the common good. Keith concludes that the idea that prejudices "are not artificially acquired, but have been grafted deeply into our natures for particular purposes" is not merely a discovery of Darwinism. Indeed, from a Christian perspective, these arational feelings must serve some higher survival purpose and are so largely present in life, that they all can't be dismissed as "sin".

A New Theory of Human Evolution (1948)
In A New Theory of Human Evolution, Keith puts forward his ideas on the co-evolution of Human beings, Races, and Cultures, covering topics such as Patriotism, Resentment and Revenge, Morality, Leadership, Nationalism, and Race. His particular theory emphasises the ideas of 'In-group versus Out-group', and the 'Amity-enmity complex'.

One chapter, entitled The Jews as a Nation and as a Race, tackles what is often referred to as 'the Jewish Question', postulating that the Jews are a special case of a race that has evolved to live as the 'out-group' amongst other races, developing a special culture that enables it to survive by means of strong cultural traditions that bind the 'in-group' with unusual loyalty and defensiveness. Such claims are very controversial today.

Physical copies of the book are difficult to obtain as it would seem that original copies exist only in small numbers, and that modern reprints do not exist. However, an online reprint of the book is available (see link below).

An Autobiography (1950)
Keith wrote his memoir when he was 84, because "a short time hence someone will have to write my obituary notice, so that what I set down now may then prove of service". He recounts how he came to pursue his scientific work, and reports on important people whom he met along the way—William Boyd Dawkins, Conan Doyle, Charles Sherrington and others. Nonetheless, the lengthy volume was deemed "completely unexciting. Events of sentimental interest and happenings of pure routine get almost equal emphasis."

Darwin Revalued (1955)

Keith went to live in a house very close to that which Darwin had occupied in Downe, Kent, in the latter years of his life, and took a great interest in trying to understand more about Charles Darwin.  In this book, written just before he died, Keith gives a lot of detail about Darwin's family life, as well as his career.

Prediction of the future
In September 1931, Keith and other prominent individuals of the time were invited by The New York Times to make a prediction concerning the world in eighty years time in the future, in 2011, to celebrate the paper's eightieth anniversary since its establishment in 1851. Keith's prediction warned against overspecialization:

Quotations

Spurious quotation 

This supposed quote is used by creationists in an attempt to demonstrate that Sir Arthur Keith simply dismisses evolutionist viewpoints outright due to a presumed anti-atheistic bias. However, in attempting to research this statement, one finds that it usually appears without primary source documentation. In those instances where seemingly original documentation is provided, it is stated to be a foreword for a centennial edition or "100th edition" of Origin of Species. However, several facts show that the attribution of these words to Arthur Keith is erroneous.

Keith died in 1955, some four years before the 100th anniversary of Darwin's work, so that he was clearly not available to write an introduction for the centennial edition (this was actually done by William Robin Thompson who did in fact hold anti-Darwinian views as can be seen from his foreword published the year after Keith died). Furthermore, while Keith did write an introduction to earlier printings of Origin of Species, in use from 1928 to 1958, the words given above do not appear in that introduction. Finally, the last "edition" of Origin of Species is the sixth edition published 1879. It is for this reason that all later publications of Origin of Species are actually reprints of this or earlier editions so that there is simply no "100th edition" of Darwin's work. The quote appears to stem from a 1947 article about—not by—Arthur Keith, in the magazine The Nineteenth Century, which was then misattributed.

References

External links

 
 
 Journal of Anatomy – Archive
 Sir Arthur Keith Biography – Who Named It?
 Evolution and Ethics (full text at designeduniverse.com)
 A New Theory Of Human Evolution – Full text 
 Web pages and timeline about the Piltdown forgery hosted by the British Geological Survey

Literature
Redman, Samuel J. Bone Rooms: From Scientific Racism to Human Prehistory in Museums. (Cambridge: Harvard University Press) 2016.

 
 

 
 

1866 births
1955 deaths
People educated at Robert Gordon's College
British anthropologists
British eugenicists
Alumni of University College London
Fellows of the Royal College of Surgeons
Fellows of the Royal Society
Foreign associates of the National Academy of Sciences
Fullerian Professors of Physiology
Human evolution theorists
Knights Bachelor
British paleoanthropologists
People from Aberdeen
Presidents of the British Science Association
Rectors of the University of Aberdeen
Scottish anatomists
Fellows of the Royal Anthropological Institute of Great Britain and Ireland
Presidents of the Royal Anthropological Institute of Great Britain and Ireland
Journal of Anatomy editors